Lianna may refer to:

Lianna, a 1983 movie by John Sayles
Lianna (comics), one of the Guardians of the Universe in DC Comics

See also
Liana (disambiguation)